Christian Maaño Señeres (born March 3, 1976) is a Filipino non-governmental organization worker who served as a member of the Philippine House of Representatives, representing the BUHAY Party-List from 2003 to 2007. He ran as a senatorial candidate for the 2013 Philippine Senate election under the newly accredited Democratic Party of the Philippines, but failed to win a seat.

References

1976 births
Democratic Party of the Philippines politicians
Members of the House of Representatives of the Philippines for Buhay Party-List
People from Makati
Living people
21st-century Filipino lawyers
Southeastern University (Florida) alumni
Northwestern University Pritzker School of Law alumni